"No Nose Job" is the second and final single from Digital Underground's second album Sons of the P. It was written and produced by Shock G.

Music video
The music video features a cameo by 2Pac.

Charts

References

1992 singles
Digital Underground songs
1991 songs
Tommy Boy Records singles
Songs written by Shock G